Xiushan Town is an urban town in Taojiang County, Hunan Province, People's Republic of China.

Administrative division
The town is divided into 11 villages and 2 communities, the following areas: Xiushan Community, Zoujiawan Community, Lianpenzui Village, Mazhuyuan Village, Hongshan Village, Shutang Village, Xiushan Village, Badu Village, Sanguanqiao Village, Jiudu Village, Huaqiaogang Village, Kangjiachong Village, and Yuemingshan Village (修山社区、邹家湾社区、连盆嘴村、麻竹垸村、洪山村、舒塘村、修山村、八都村、三官桥村、九都村、花桥港村、康家冲村、月明山村).

References

External links

Divisions of Taojiang County